The 2020–21 Brentford F.C. season was the club's 131st season in existence and seventh consecutive season in the Championship, the second tier of English football. Brentford would also compete in the FA Cup and competed in the EFL Cup. The season covered the period from 1 September 2020 to 30 June 2021. Brentford secured promotion to the Premier League on 29 May 2021, following a 2–0 victory against Swansea City in the play-off final at Wembley, confirming the club's top flight status for the first time in 74 years.

This season marked the club's move to the Brentford Community Stadium from Griffin Park, its home for 116 years.

First team squad

 Players' ages are as of the opening day of the 2020–21 season.

Coaching staff

Source: brentfordfc.com

Transfers

Transfers in

Loans in

Loans out

Transfers out

Pre-season

Competitions

Overview

Championship

League table

Results summary

Results by matchday

Matches

Play-offs

FA Cup

EFL Cup

Statistics

Appearances and goals

 Players listed in italics left the club mid-season
Source: Soccerbase

Goalscorers 

Players listed in italics left the club mid-season
Source: Soccerbase

Discipline 

 Players listed in italics left the club mid-season.
 Source: ESPN

International caps 

Players listed in italics left the club mid-season
Only international caps won while contracted to Brentford are counted.

Awards 

 EFL Championship Player of the Month: Ivan Toney (October 2020)
EFL Championship Manager of the Month: Thomas Frank (December 2020)
EFL Championship Team of the Year: Ivan Toney
EFL Championship Golden Boot: Ivan Toney
London Football Awards EFL Player of the Year: Ivan Toney
EFL Cup Team of the Tournament: Luke Daniels
EFL Cup Goal of the Round:
Emiliano Marcondes: third round
Saïd Benrahma (fourth round)
DBU Coach of the Year: Thomas Frank
PFA Championship Team of the Year: Rico Henry, Ethan Pinnock, Ivan Toney
Supporters' Player of the Year: Ivan Toney

References

External links

Brentford F.C. seasons
Brentford F.C.
Brentford
Brentford